George Ellis Crompton (17 July 1886 – 1953) was a professional footballer who played for Padiham, Blackburn Rovers, Tottenham Hotspur, Exeter City, Bristol Rovers, Barnstaple Town, Llanelly and Barry Town.

Football career 
Crompton began his football career at Padiham before joining Blackburn Rovers in 1906 where he played in 35 matches and scored 20 goals between 1906 and 1910. The right half could also slot in to the inside right position joined Tottenham Hotspur where he featured in  10 matches in all competitions. After leaving White Hart Lane Crompton joined Exeter City where he made 31 appearances in the Southern League, scoring 10 goals during the 1912–13 season, before joining then-Southern League side Bristol Rovers in 1913. He made a total of 108 Southern League appearances, scoring 26 times in a spell that was interrupted by World War I and played a further 41 games in Division Three after Rovers joined The Football League in 1920. Crompton re-joined Exeter City in 1921 to make 145 appearances and netting six goals. He played for non-League clubs Barnstaple Town, Llanelly and Barry Town before retiring in 1925.

References 

1886 births
1953 deaths
People from Ramsbottom
English footballers
Southern Football League players
English Football League players
Blackburn Rovers F.C. players
Tottenham Hotspur F.C. players
Exeter City F.C. players
Bristol Rovers F.C. players
Padiham F.C. players
Barnstaple Town F.C. players
Barry Town United F.C. players
Footballers from Greater Manchester
Association football inside forwards
Association football wing halves